United Nations Security Council Resolution 106 was adopted unanimously on March 29, 1955, after hearing reports from the Chief of Staff of the United Nations Truce Supervision Organization in Palestine and representatives of Egypt and Israel.  The Council noted that the Egyptian-Israel Mixed Armistice Commission determined that a "prearranged and planned attack ordered by Israel authorities" was committed by regular Israeli forces against elements of the Egyptian Army in the Gaza Strip on February 28, 1955.  The Council condemned this attack as a violation of United Nations Security Council Resolution 54, called upon Israel to take all necessary measures to prevent such action, expressed its conviction that the maintenance of the General Armistice Agreement was threatened by deliberate violations and that no progress towards the return of permanent peace in Palestine would be made unless the parties complied strictly with their obligations.

See also
 List of United Nations Security Council Resolutions 101 to 200 (1953–1965)
 United Nations Security Council Resolution 107

References
 Text of the Resolution at undocs.org

External links
 

 0106
 0106

1955 in Egypt
 0106
1955 in Israel
March 1955 events